The following is a list of riots and protests involving violent disorder that have occurred in London:

1189: The Massacre of the Jews at the coronation of Richard I
1196: William with the long beard causes riots when he preaches for the poor against the rich
1221: Riots occur after London defeats Westminster in an annual wrestling contest; ring-leaders hanged or mutilated in punishment.
1268: Rioting between goldsmiths and tailors
1340: Fishmongers riot with Skinners after a Skinner murders a Fishmonger's servant, Ralph Turk.

1391: Riots break out in Salisbury Place over a baker's loaf
1517: Evil May Day riot against foreigners takes place
1668: Bawdy House Riots took place following repression of a series of attacks against brothels
1710: Sacheverell riots, following the trial of the preacher, Henry Sacheverell
1719: Spitalfields weavers rioted, attacking women wearing Indian clothing and then attempting to rescue their arrested comrades
1743: Riots against Gin Taxes and other legislation to control the Gin Craze, principally the Gin Act 1736; rioting was fuelled by consumption of the drink itself
1768: The Massacre of St George's Fields after the imprisonment of John Wilkes for criticising the King
1769: The Spitalfield riots when silk weavers attempted to maintain their rate of pay
1780: Gordon riots against Catholics
1788: The notorious Westminster by-election held in the summer of 1788 resulting in 2 deaths and more than 40 injured.
1809: Old Price Riots, 1809 following a rise in the price of theatre tickets
1816: Spa Fields riots, Spenceans met in support of the common ownership of land
1830: Attacks against the Duke of Wellington in his carriage and on his home, for his opposition to electoral reform (which had been seen partly as a solution to rioting by rural workers).
1866: a riot took place in Hyde Park after a meeting of the Reform League was declared illegal
1886: The West End Riots followed a counter-demonstration by the Social Democratic Federation against a meeting of the Fair Trade League.
1887: Bloody Sunday, a demonstration against coercion in Ireland and to demand the release from prison the MP William O'Brien
1907: The Brown Dog riots, medical students attempt to tear down an anti-vivisection statue.
1919: The Battle of Bow Street, Australian, American and Canadian servicemen rioted against the Metropolitan Police
1932: The National Hunger March ended in rioting after the police confiscated the petition of the National Unemployed Workers' Movement

1936: The Battle of Cable Street saw rioting against the Metropolitan Police as they attempted to facilitate a march by the British Union of Fascists
1958: Notting Hill race riots between White British and West Indian immigrants.
1968: Rioting outside the United States Embassy in Grosvenor Square in opposition to the Vietnam War.
1974: Red Lion Square disorders happened following a march by counter-fascists against the National Front.
1976: Riots during the Notting Hill Carnival.
1977: The Battle of Lewisham occurred when the Metropolitan Police attempted to facilitate a march by the National Front
1979: Southall riots during an Anti-Nazi League demonstration in opposition to the National Front.
1981: Brixton riot against the Metropolitan Police. Especially on 10 July, rioting extended to other parts of London and numerous other cities around the UK
1985: Brixton riot against the Metropolitan Police after they shot the mother of suspect Michael Groce
1985: Broadwater Farm riot, residents of Tottenham riot against the Metropolitan Police following a death during a police search
1990: Poll Tax riots followed the introduction of a poll tax
1993: Welling riots, October 1993. A march organised by the ANL, the SWP and Militant resulted in riots against the Metropolitan police.
1994: Riot during the second march against the Criminal Justice Bill
1995: 1995 Brixton riot against the Metropolitan Police occurred after a death in police custody
1996: Rioting in Trafalgar Square and surrounding streets following England losing against Germany in the semi-final of UEFA Euro 1996

1999: Carnival Against Capitalism riot
2000: Anti-capitalist May Day riot
2001: May Day riot in central London by anti-capitalist protestors.
2002: Rioting around The New Den stadium following Millwall F.C. losing against Birmingham City F.C. in the 2002 Football League Division One play-off.
2009: G-20 London summit protests occurred in the days around the G-20 summit.
2009: Upton Park riot before, during and after a 2009–10 Football League Cup second round match between West Ham United F.C. and Millwall F.C.
2010: UK student protests against increases in student fees and public sector cuts.
2011: Anti-cuts protest in London against government public spending cuts.
2011: England riots, initially in London, following the police shooting of Mark Duggan in Tottenham
2017: Rioting outside Forest Gate police station following the Death of Edson Da Costa.

References

Notes

 
Riots
London
Riots in London